Mountain of the Sun is a  elevation Navajo Sandstone summit located in Zion National Park, in Washington County of southwest Utah, United States. It is set on the east side of the North Fork of the Virgin River which drains precipitation runoff from this mountain. Its neighbors include The Sentinel, Mount Spry, The East Temple, and Mount Moroni. This feature's name was officially adopted in 1934 by the U.S. Board on Geographic Names.

Climate
Spring and fall are the most favorable seasons to visit Mountain of the Sun. According to the Köppen climate classification system, it is located in a Cold semi-arid climate zone, which is defined by the coldest month having an average mean temperature below , and at least 50% of the total annual precipitation being received during the spring and summer.

Gallery

See also

 List of mountains in Utah
 Geology of the Zion and Kolob canyons area
 Colorado Plateau

References

External links

 Zion National Park National Park Service
 Mountain of the Sun rock climbing: mountainproject.com
 Hiking information: Zionnational-park.com

Mountains of Utah
Zion National Park
Mountains of Washington County, Utah
Sandstone formations of the United States
Colorado Plateau
North American 2000 m summits